Nijelamer is a village in Weststellingwerf in the province of Friesland, the Netherlands. It had a population of around 153 in 2017.

The village was first mentioned in 1320 as Nienlameren. The etymology is unclear. It uses Nije (new) to distinguish from Oldelamer. Nijelamer has no church, but only a bell tower. The tower was restored in 1795.

Nijelamer was home to 257 people in 1840.

Gallery

References

External links

Geography of Weststellingwerf
Populated places in Friesland